In enzymology, a cyanohydrin beta-glucosyltransferase is an enzyme that catalyzes the chemical reaction

UDP-D-glucose + (S)-4-hydroxymandelonitrile  UDP + (S)-4-hydroxymandelonitrile beta-D-glucoside

Thus, the two substrates of this enzyme are UDP-D-glucose and (S)-4-hydroxymandelonitrile, whereas its two products are UDP and (S)-4-hydroxymandelonitrile beta-D-glucoside.

This enzyme belongs to the family of glycosyltransferases, specifically the hexosyltransferases.  The systematic name of this enzyme class is UDP-D-glucose:(S)-4-hydroxymandelonitrile beta-D-glucosyltransferase. Other names in common use include uridine diphosphoglucose-p-hydroxymandelonitrile, glucosyltransferase, UDP-glucose-p-hydroxymandelonitrile glucosyltransferase, uridine diphosphoglucose-cyanohydrin glucosyltransferase, uridine diphosphoglucose:aldehyde cyanohydrin, beta-glucosyltransferase, UDP-glucose:(S)-4-hydroxymandelonitrile beta-D-glucosyltransferase, UGT85B1, and UDP-glucose:p-hydroxymandelonitrile-O-glucosyltransferase.  This enzyme participates in tyrosine metabolism and cyanoamino acid metabolism.

References

 
 
 
 
 

EC 2.4.1
Enzymes of unknown structure